Mary Pierce was the defending champion but lost in the third round to Amy Frazier.

Jennifer Capriati won the title, defeating Martina Hingis in the final 6–0, 4–6, 6–4.

Seeds
A champion seed is indicated in bold text while text in italics indicates the round in which that seed was eliminated. The top eight seeds received a bye to the second round.

  Martina Hingis (final)
  Jennifer Capriati (champion)
  Conchita Martínez (semifinals)
  Amanda Coetzer (quarterfinals)
  Arantxa Sánchez-Vicario (second round)
  Mary Pierce (third round)
  Amélie Mauresmo (quarterfinals)
  Chanda Rubin (second round)
  Paola Suárez (third round)
  Amy Frazier (quarterfinals)
  Lisa Raymond (third round)
  Meghann Shaughnessy (second round)
  Jelena Dokić (first round)
  Gala León García (third round)
  Henrieta Nagyová (third round)
  Silvia Farina Elia (second round)

Draw

Finals

Top half

Section 1

Section 2

Bottom half

Section 3

Section 4

References
 2001 Family Circle Cup draw

Charleston Open
2001 WTA Tour
Family Circle